Major Sir Frank Henry Bowater, 1st Baronet, TD, CStJ (3 April 1866 – 10 November 1947) was Lord Mayor of London from 1938 to 1939, son of William Vansittart Bowater and his wife Eliza Jane née Davey.

Career
In 1905, Bowater was commissioned in the service of the 4th London Howitzer Brigade Royal Field Artillery (Royal Artillery, Territorial Army), rose to the rank of Major in 1908, rank gained at its service, and fought in World War I. He also held the office of Lord Lieutenant of the City of London in 1914 and was awarded the Territorial Decoration (TD). From 1929 to 1930 he held the office of Sheriff of London and was decorated with the awards of the Order of the Crown (Romania), Grand Officier of the Legion of Honour and Companion of the Most Venerable Order of the Hospital of Saint John of Jerusalem (CStJ) and was invested as a Knight Bachelor. He then held the office of Lord Mayor of London from 1938 to 1939 and was created 1st Baronet Bowater, of Friston, Suffolk (UK) upon his retirement on 11 October 1939.

Marriage and issue
On 8 October 1891, he married Ethel Anita Fryar, who died on 19 December 1945, following an accident, who was invested as a Companion of the Most Venerable Order of the Hospital of Saint John of Jerusalem (CStJ), daughter of Mark Lindsay Fryar, of Rangoon, Burma, who was in the Indian Civil Service, and they had four children: 
 Sir Noël Vansittart Bowater, 2nd Baronet (25 December 1892 – 22 January 1984).
 Ethel May Bowater (13 May 1896 - 1990), who usually went by her middle name of May, married on 5 February 1916 Captain Olaus Charles William Johnsen (25 October 1889 – 20 April 1960), son of W. M. Johnsen, and had issue.
 Beryl Stuart Bowater (11 December 1902 – 8 October 1972), married on 9 April 1931 Colonel Arthur Howard Eckford Howell, who lived at 5 Headford Place, London, gained the rank of Colonel in the service of the Royal Artillery and was decorated with the awards of the Territorial Decoration (TD) and Companion of the Distinguished Service Order (DSO), son of Lieutenant Colonel Ernest Alfred Russell Howell), and had issue
 Sir Ian Frank Bowater (16 December 1904 – 1 October 1982).

Arms

References

Sources
 Charles Mosley, editor, Burke's Peerage and Baronetage, 106th edition, 2 volumes (Crans, Switzerland: Burke's Peerage (Genealogical Books) Ltd, 1999), volume 1, pages 51, 456 and 457.

1866 births
1947 deaths
Royal Artillery officers
Baronets in the Baronetage of the United Kingdom
Knights of the Order of St John
Lord-Lieutenants of the City of London
Sheriffs of the City of London
Recipients of the Order of the Crown (Romania)
Grand Officiers of the Légion d'honneur
20th-century lord mayors of London
20th-century English politicians
British Army personnel of World War I
Members of London County Council
Knights Bachelor